Järvelä is a Finnish surname. Notable people with the surname include:

 Arto Järvelä (born 1964), Finnish composer and fiddler
 Jonne Järvelä (born 1974), Finnish guitarist and singer
 Maija Järvelä, Finnish biathlonist
 Mauno Järvelä (born 1949), Finnish musician

Finnish-language surnames